Jarrett Byers (born August 3, 1985) is a former American football wide receiver. He was signed by the St. Louis Rams as an undrafted free agent in 2009. He played college football at Northeastern State.

College career
Byers, from Kansas City, Kansas, is a three-year starter and 2008 All-America choice in football. He transferred from Coffeyville Community College to Northeastern State University in 2005. He finished 2008 with 57 catches for 699 yards and eight touchdowns.  It was his skills as a kick returner that emerged in 2008 as he returned nine kickoffs for 338 yards and two touchdowns. An injury cut short his senior season in 2007. However, he bypassed an opportunity to enter the NFL draft a year ago after receiving a medical hardship waiver and was granted an additional season. Byers came back to Northeastern State where he broke school career records for receptions (165), receiving yards (2,545) and touchdowns (28). In 2006, he was selected as the Lone Star Conference North Division Receiver of the Year and to the First-team All-LSC-North. Recorded 51 receptions for 844 yards and 11 touchdowns and averaged 16.5 yards per catch . Byers also rushed for 182 yards on 14 carries and one touchdown, and returned six kickoffs for 113 yards.  In 2005  had 43 receptions for 896 yards and nine touchdowns. Averaged 20.8 yards per catch and 99.6 yards per game while earning Second-team All-LSC-North.

Professional career

St. Louis Rams
On April 26, 2009, Byers was signed as an undrafted free agent by the St. Louis Rams. He was waived on September 1.

Tulsa Talons
Byers spent the 2010 off-season with the Tulsa Talons of the Arena Football League. He was released by the Talons on March 27, 2010.

References

External links
St. Louis Rams bio

1985 births
Living people
American football wide receivers
Northeastern State RiverHawks football players
St. Louis Rams players
Sportspeople from Kansas City, Kansas
Players of American football from Kansas
Tulsa Talons players